Paolo Ruffini may refer to:
 Paolo Ruffini (mathematician) (1765-1822) - Italian mathematician and philosopher
 8524 Paoloruffini, a minor planet named for the mathematician
 Paolo Ruffini (actor) (1978) - Italian actor, film director and presenter